David James Thouless  (21 September 1934 – 6 April 2019) was a British condensed-matter physicist. He was the winner of the 1990 Wolf Prize and a laureate of the 2016 Nobel Prize for physics along with F. Duncan M. Haldane and J. Michael Kosterlitz for theoretical discoveries of topological phase transitions and topological phases of matter.

Education
Born on 21 September 1934 in Bearsden, Scotland  to English parents, Priscilla (Gorton) Thouless, an English teacher, and psychologist and broadcaster, Robert Thouless, David Thouless was educated at Winchester College and earned a Bachelor of Arts degree in Natural Sciences from the University of Cambridge as an undergraduate student of Trinity Hall, Cambridge. He obtained his PhD at Cornell University, where Hans Bethe was his doctoral advisor.

Career and research
Thouless was a postdoctoral researcher at Lawrence Berkeley Laboratory, University of California, Berkeley, and also worked in the physics department from 1958 to 1959, giving a course on atomic physics. He was the first director of studies in physics at Churchill College, Cambridge, in 1961–1965, professor of mathematical physics at the University of Birmingham in the United Kingdom in 1965–1978, and professor of applied science at Yale University from 1979 to 1980, before becoming a professor of physics at the University of Washington in Seattle in 1980. Thouless made many theoretical contributions to the understanding of extended systems of atoms and electrons, and of nucleons. He also worked on superconductivity phenomena, properties of nuclear matter, and excited collective motions within nuclei.

Thouless made many important contributions to the theory of many-body problems. For atomic nuclei, he cleared up the concept of 'rearrangement energy' and derived an expression for the moment of inertia of deformed nuclei. In statistical mechanics, he contributed many ideas to the understanding of ordering, including the concept of 'topological ordering'. Other important results relate to localised electron states in disordered lattices.

Academic papers
Selected papers include:

Books

Awards and honours
Thouless was elected a Fellow of the Royal Society (FRS) in 1979, a Fellow of the American Physical Society (1986), a Fellow of the American Academy of Arts and Sciences, and a member of the US National Academy of Sciences (1995). Among his awards are the Wolf Prize for Physics (1990), the Paul Dirac Medal of the Institute of Physics (1993), the Lars Onsager Prize of the American Physical Society (2000), and the Nobel Prize in Physics (2016).

Personal life
Thouless married Margaret Elizabeth Scrase in 1958 and together they had three children. In 2016, Thouless was reported to be suffering from dementia. He died on 6 April 2019 in Cambridge, aged 84.

See also
Hofstadter's butterfly
Single-electron transistor

References

External links

1934 births
2019 deaths
People educated at Winchester College
Alumni of Trinity Hall, Cambridge
Fellows of Churchill College, Cambridge
Cornell University alumni
Fellows of Clare Hall, Cambridge
Alumni of Clare Hall, Cambridge
People from Bearsden
Members of the United States National Academy of Sciences
21st-century American physicists
American nuclear physicists
University of Washington faculty
Wolf Prize in Physics laureates
Fellows of the Royal Society
Maxwell Medal and Prize recipients
Academics of the University of Birmingham
British emigrants to the United States
Nobel laureates in Physics
American Nobel laureates
British Nobel laureates
Scottish Nobel laureates
Fellows of the American Physical Society